Neopentyl glycol (IUPAC name: 2,2-dimethylpropane-1,3-diol) is an organic chemical compound. It is used in the synthesis of polyesters, paints, lubricants, and plasticizers. When used in the manufacture of polyesters, it enhances the stability of the product towards heat, light, and water. By esterification reaction with fatty or carboxylic acids, synthetic lubricating esters with reduced potential for oxidation or hydrolysis, compared to natural esters, can be produced.

Reactions 
Neopentyl glycol is synthesized industrially by the aldol reaction of formaldehyde and isobutyraldehyde. This creates the intermediate hydroxypivaldehyde, which can be converted to neopentyl glycol by either a Cannizzaro reaction with excess formaldehyde, or by hydrogenation using palladium on carbon.

It is used as a protecting group for ketones, for example in gestodene synthesis.

A condensation reaction of neopentyl glycol with 2,6-di-tert-butylphenol gives CGP-7930.

Organoboronic acid esters of neopentyl glycol are useful in the Suzuki reaction.

Neopentyl glycol is the starting material used to synthesize Neopentyl glycol diglycidyl ether. It is reacted with epichlorohydrin using a Lewis acid catalyst and the intermediate halohydrin is further reacted with sodium hydroxide to dehydrochlorinate it to give the finished product.

Research
It has been reported that plastic crystals of neopentyl glycol exhibit a colossal barocaloric effect (CBCEs), which is a cooling effect caused by pressure-induced phase transitions. The obtained entropy changes are about 389 joules per kilogram per kelvin near room temperature. This CBCE phenomenon is likely to be very useful in future solid-state refrigeration technologies.

See also
 Pentaerythritol
 Trimethylolethane
 Trimethylolpropane

References 

Monomers
Plasticizers
Alkanediols